Shusha Museum of History was one of 8 museums located in Shusha, Azerbaijan. It was founded in 1969 and contained up to 5,000 exhibits. The museum was closed after the capture of Shusha on May 8, 1992.

History 
The idea of establishing Shusha Museum of History dates back to 1967. At that time, Arif Agakishiyev, who worked as the first secretary of Shusha District Party Committee, raised the idea of creating such a museum before the Ministry of Culture and the idea was positively received.

Collecting of exhibits

Opening ceremony

Departments

Governance

Exhibits

After occupation

References 

Museums in Azerbaijan
Defunct museums
History museums in Azerbaijan
Museums in Shusha
Museums established in 1969
Museums disestablished in 1992